Alexandra "Lexi" Bender (born July 22, 1993) is an American professional ice hockey player for the Boston Pride of the National Women's Hockey League (NWHL).

Personal life
During college, Bender played in the NCAA for Boston College in the women's ice hockey team.

NWHL
Bender was drafted 15th overall in the 2015 NWHL draft by the Boston Pride. In 2016, Bender signed a one-year, $10,000 contract to play for the Boston Pride in the 2016/17 season. Bender appeared in all 17 regular season games for the franchise, and two postseason games.

On May 23, 2017, it was announced that Bender had re-signed to play with the Boston Pride for their 2017/18 season. Bender participated in the 3rd NWHL All-Star Game.

References

External links
 

1993 births
Living people
American women's ice hockey defensemen
Boston Pride players
Boston College Eagles women's ice hockey players